Chlorophyllum agaricoides, known commonly as the puffball parasol, false puffball, or puffball agaric, is a species of fungus belonging to the family Agaricaceae. When young, it is edible, and has been traditionally eaten in Turkey for many years. 

It has cosmopolitan distribution, with notable documentation in China, Mongolia, Bulgaria, and Turkey. It is also a protected species in Hungary, and is believed to be in decline across Europe due to habitat destruction.

Description
It is a secotioid mushroom, meaning its hymenium takes the form of a gleba made of underdeveloped gills, completely enclosed by the cap, which never fully opens. This protects the mushroom from desiccation. The cap is egg-shaped to spherical, often tapering upward to form a blunt, conical point 1-7cm wide and 2-10cm tall. It is white, and becomes dark brown with age. It is mostly smooth, with some small fibrils, though it may also develop fibrous scales. The gills are contorted, irregularly chambered, and underdeveloped, making up an enclosed gleba which is white, aging to a mustardy yellow-brown. The stipe is 0-3cm long and 0.5-2cm thick. There is no ring. Its odor becomes cabbagey with age. It grows singularly or in clusters mostly on cultivated land or grass, though occasionally on the forest floor. The spores are 6.5-9.5 x 5-7µm, globose to elliptic, green to yellow-brown, turning reddish brown in Melzer's. The germ pore is indistinct. Cheilocystidia and pleurocystidia are absent. Agaricus inapertus is a look-alike, although unlike C. agaricoides, it prefers forests and develops a black gleba with age.

References

Agaricaceae